Riccardo Di Segni (born November 13, 1949) is the chief rabbi of Rome.

A specialist in diagnostic radiology, he is descended from three generations of rabbis. He completed his rabbinical studies in 1973 and was elected chief rabbi of Rome in 2001. 

In 2005, Di Segni was present at the funeral of John Paul II, with whom he had cordial relations. He has expressed concern over the state of Christian–Jewish dialogue during the papacy of Benedict XVI, at a time shortly after the Italian Rabbinical Assembly decided to temporarily suspend interfaith talks.

Works
1976: Guida alle regole alimentari ebraiche
1981: Le unghie di Adamo
1985: Il Vangelo del Ghetto
1990: Catalogue of the Manuscripts of the Library of the Collegio Rabbinico Italiano (in English)
1998: Noten ta'am leshevach, ta'ame hakashrut baparshanut hayehudit (in Hebrew)

References

1949 births
Italian Orthodox rabbis
Living people
Physicians from Rome
Italian radiologists
20th-century Italian rabbis
21st-century Italian rabbis
Rabbis from Rome